Statistics of Bahraini Premier League for the 2002 season.

Overview
It was contested by 18 teams, playing in a single round-robin format. Muharraq Club won the championship. The top 10 teams would go to the next Premier League season, while the bottom 8 teams would form the 2nd Division of the next season.

League standings

References
Bahrain - List of final tables (RSSSF)

Bahraini Premier League seasons
1
1
Bah
Bah